Gymnelia pavo is a moth of the subfamily Arctiinae. It was described by George Hampson in 1914. It is found in Guyana.

References

Gymnelia
Moths described in 1914